Tasmannia piperita is a species of shrubs or treelets belonging to the Winter's bark family (Winteraceae) and  native to Borneo, the Philippines, Sulawesi, the Moluccas, Flores, New Guinea, and Australia. It is the most widespread species of Tasmannia and the only one occurring outside of Australia. Also known as Drimys piperita, it is the most variable flower discovered to date: it may have as many as fifteen petals or as few as  none, as many as  109 stamens or as few as 7, and as many as fifteen carpels or as few as one.

References

piperita
Flora of Malesia
Flora of Papuasia
Flora of Australia